Ray Bennett (born May 17, 1962) is a Canadian ice hockey coach. He served as an assistant coach in the National Hockey League with the Los Angeles Kings from 1999 to 2006 and the St. Louis Blues from 2007-2017. He is currently an assistant coach with the Colorado Avalanche and a Stanley Cup Champion.

Prior to joining the National Hockey League, Bennett served two seasons as the head coach of the Red Deer College men's ice hockey team.

References

External links

Ray Bennett's profile at Eliteprospects.com

1962 births
Living people
Canadian ice hockey coaches
Los Angeles Kings coaches
St. Louis Blues coaches
Colorado Avalanche coaches